Graham Station is an unincorporated community in Mason County, in the U.S. state of West Virginia.

History
A post office called Graham Station was established in 1863, and remained in operation until 1943. The hamlet was named after William Graham, a local minister.

References

Unincorporated communities in Mason County, West Virginia
Unincorporated communities in West Virginia